Trident Cars Ltd was a British car manufacturer based originally in Woodbridge, then in Ipswich, Suffolk between 1966 and 1974, and again after being restarted in 1976 from premises in Ipswich. The new company stopped production in 1977-78.

Their first car, the prototype Clipper convertible, was based on a prototype TVR model which had two seater coupé steel and aluminium bodywork styled by Englishman Trevor Frost (also known as Trevor Fiore, and also responsible for the Elva GT160) and built in Italy by Carrozzeria Fissore. This TVR Trident Coupé was shown at the 1965 Geneva Motor Show and in addition two more coupés and a single convertible prototype were also made.

Due to a financial crisis at the TVR company, the project passed instead to one of their dealers, W.J. (Bill) Last, who created a separate Trident Cars company to manufacture it using the premises previously used by him for making the Peel Viking Sport. The cars were at first fitted with Ford 4.7 litre V8 in a chassis that was a near copy of the one used on the Austin-Healey 3000 and had similar styling to the TVR prototypes, but were made instead in fibreglass. The first Trident Clipper Convertible prototype was displayed at the Racing Car Show at Olympia in London in January 1966 but little more was heard until the first Clipper Coupé was shown, again at the Olympia Racing Car Show, in January 1967.

It was available as a complete car or in kit form. The cars were expensive, the kit version costing £1,923.  

A second car, the Venturer was announced in 1969 with similar bodywork and powered by a Ford 3 litre V6 but now on a lengthened (to 93 inches) Triumph TR6 chassis giving the car independent suspension all round by coil springs. In 1971, the car cost £2,300 in kit form.

Following problems with engine supply following a strike at Ford, Chrysler 5.4 litre V8 engines were fitted to the Clipper from 1971 and the Tycoon fitted with a Triumph 2.5 litre straight 6 engine was added to the range. The car now cost £3,250 fully built.  

The engine problems and financial climate in the 1970s resulted in the company closing down in 1974. An attempt was made to restart production in 1976 but few cars were made before final closure in 1977.

Between 1967 and 1977, about 39 Clippers, 84 Venturers and 7 Tycoons were produced.

See also
 List of car manufacturers of the United Kingdom

References

External links 
The Trident Car Club
The TVR Trident
The new Trident Iceni
Trident Iceni article at Top Gear

Kit car manufacturers
Defunct motor vehicle manufacturers of England
Companies based in Suffolk